Nuclear fragile X mental retardation-interacting protein 1 is a protein that in humans is encoded by the NUFIP1 gene.

Interactions 

NUFIP1 has been shown to interact with:
 BRCA1,
 Cyclin T1,  and
 FMR1.

References

Further reading